Coupe or Coupé is a car body style.

Coupe may also refer to:

Coupé (carriage), a four-wheeled carriage
Drophead coupé, a historical term for a convertible
Champagne coupe, a stemmed glass
Coupe (Pop Smoke song)
Coupé (song) by AJ Tracey
La Coupe, a horse race in France

People
Brandon Coupe (born 1972), an American tennis player
Dan Coupe (1885–1952), an English footballer
Jean-Marie-Louis Coupé (1732–1818), a French librarian
Mike Coupe (born 1960) a British businessman
Stuart Coupe (born 1956), an Australian music journalist
Thomas Coupe (1818–1875), an American sailor
William Barrington-Coupe (1931–2014), a British record producer